Jean Freslon (born 11 August 1946) is a French rower. He competed in the men's coxed four event at the 1968 Summer Olympics.

References

1946 births
Living people
French male rowers
Olympic rowers of France
Rowers at the 1968 Summer Olympics
Sportspeople from Tours, France